The Silent Enigma is the second album by British rock band Anathema, released on 1995 through Peaceville Records.

Recording and legacy

The Silent Enigma represents a turning point in Anathema's career (it is the first album to feature guitarist Vincent Cavanagh singing lead vocals, replacing Darren White) and sees the band incorporating more clean vocals and melodic elements, while still retaining the band's early death-doom style. The album was originally titled Rise Pantheon Dreams, a title later used by White for his post-Anathema project The Blood Divine.

Where Darren's vocals were more guttural, Vincent's newer style pushed the possibilities for Anathema onwards and upwards, with a scope and breath beyond his years. Lauded by the metal press, the album has since been described by Terrorizer magazine as "one of Anathema's best". The special edition of the album also features two bonus tracks.

Orchestral versions of "...Alone" and "Sunset of Age" were recorded for the 2011 compilation Falling Deeper.

Track listing
All songs written by Anathema.

2003 Remastered Release
A remastered version of The Silent Enigma was released on 2003 by Peaceville Records. The 2-disc package features the entire The Silent Enigma album fully re-mastered on CD, along with a DVD featuring a live performance recorded in Kraków, Poland, in March 1996, as well as promotional videos for the tracks "Sweet Tears", "Mine Is Yours to Drown In (Ours Is the New Tribe)", "The Silent Enigma", and "Hope".

DVD
Promotional Videos
"Sweet Tears"
"Mine Is Yours"
"The Silent Enigma"
"Hope"

Live (Krakow 1.3.96)
"Intro"
"Restless Oblivion"
"Shroud of Frost"
"We the Gods"
"Sunset of Age"
"Mine Is Yours"
"Sleepless"
"The Silent Enigma"
"A Dying Wish"

Personnel

 Vincent Cavanagh - vocals, guitars
 John Douglas - drums, percussion
 Duncan Patterson - bass
 Danny Cavanagh - guitars

Guest musicians
 Derek Fullwood - spoken word on "Shroud of Frost"
 Rebecca Wilson - female vocals on "...Alone"

Production
 Meany - photography (band)
 Simon Mooney - photography
 Danny Cavanagh - orchestral arrangements
 Mags - mixing
 Hammy - executive producer
 Kev Ridley - engineering
 Joseph Wright of Derby - cover art. "Lady in Milton's Comus", 1785.

References

1995 albums
Anathema (band) albums
Peaceville Records albums
Albums produced by Kevin Ridley